Toulou Kiki is a Nigerien actress and singer. She was nominated for Africa Movie Academy Award for Best Actress in a Supporting Role for her role in Timbuktu.

Career 
In 2014, she played "Satima" in Timbuktu. The role got her a best supporting actress nomination at the 11th Africa Movie Academy Awards. She eventually lost out the award to Hilda Dokubo.

References 

1983 births
Nigerien film actors
21st-century Nigerien women singers
Living people
Nigerien actresses
21st-century Nigerian actresses